was the fourth son of Hōjō Ujiyasu. Very early in his life he became an acquaintance of Tokugawa Ieyasu, because he alike was also at the time a hostage of the Imagawa. Far later in 1590, he was persuaded to surrender when Odawara Castle was attacked by Toyotomi Hideyoshi. He then set off to Odawara in an attempt to negotiate peace.

Tokugawa Ieyasu granted Hojo the Sayama fiefdom, an estate of ten thousand koku.

References 

Go-Hōjō clan
1545 births
1600 deaths